Mount Carl Heller is a 13,211-foot-elevation (4,031 meter) mountain summit located on the crest of the Sierra Nevada mountain range in California. It is situated on the common border shared by Tulare County with Inyo County, as well as the shared boundary of Sequoia National Park and John Muir Wilderness. Mount Carl Heller ranks as the 105th-highest summit in California.

History
The first ascent of the summit was made in August 1966 by Carl Heller and Al Green via the East Arête.

This landform is unofficially named after Dr. Carl Anthony Heller (1922–1984), founder of the China Lake Mountain Rescue Group in 1958. His group's search and rescue operations in the Mount Whitney area saved many. He was a research chemist and mountaineer who made the first ascent of this peak. This feature has also been called "Vacation Peak", in association with its position immediately above Vacation Pass.

Climate
According to the Köppen climate classification system, Mount Carl Heller is located in an alpine climate zone. Most weather fronts originate in the Pacific Ocean, and travel east toward the Sierra Nevada mountains. As fronts approach, they are forced upward by the peaks (orographic lift), causing them to drop their moisture in the form of rain or snowfall onto the range. Precipitation runoff from this mountain drains west to the Kern River via Wallace Creek, and east to Owens Valley via George Creek.

See also
 
 List of mountain peaks of California

References

External links
 Carl Heller biography: China Lake Mountain Rescue Group.org
 Mt. Carl Heller climbing: Mountainproject.com

Mountains of Tulare County, California
Mountains of Sequoia National Park
Inyo National Forest
Mountains of Inyo County, California
Mountains of the John Muir Wilderness
North American 4000 m summits
Mountains of Northern California
Sierra Nevada (United States)